Kuiba 3 is a 2014 Chinese animated fantasy action adventure film directed by Wang Chuan, Zhang Gang and Zhou Jie. It was released on October 1 in China. The film is preceded by Kuiba 2 (2013) and will be followed by Kuiba 4, scheduled for release in 2020.

Voice cast
Liu Jingluo
Yao Shu
Wang Yuteng
Yang Chen
Liu Xiaoyu
Wang Kai
Ao Lei
Shi Kunkun
Song Ming
Ma Haifeng
Yang Ning
Jie A
Fan Zhechen
Tute Hameng
Jiang Guangtao

Reception
The film earned  at the Chinese box office.

References

2014 action films
2010s adventure films
2014 fantasy films
2014 animated films
2014 films
Animated action films
Animated adventure films
Chinese animated fantasy films
Chinese action adventure films